Johann Michael Fehr (9 May 161015 November 1688) was a German doctor, botanist and scientist who is most notable for being one of the four founding members of the German National Academy of Sciences Leopoldina.

Biography 
Fehr was born on 9 May 1610 to Michael Fehr and Margarete Martin. He studied Medicine at the universities of Leipzig, Wittenberg, Jena,  Altdorf and at the University of Padua where he got promoted to Dr. med. et phil in 1641.

In 1642, he would marry Maria Barbara, whom he would have three children with. Upon her death in 1658, he would marry Anna Maria in Schweinfurt whom he would have four more children with.

Along with three others he founded the "academia naturae curiosorum" on 1 January 1652, which is now known as the German National Academy of Sciences Leopoldina, which was the first academy like it at the time making it the oldest academy of science in Germany. After the death of Johann Lorenz Bausch, he would take his position and become the second President of the academy, serving from 1666 until 1686.

He died at the age of 78 on 15 November 1688 in Schweinfurt and was buried at the Paulinerkirche in Leipzig.

Selected works 
 Anchora sacra vel Scorzonera (1666)
 Hiera picra seu analecta de absynthio (1667)

References 

People from Kitzingen
Leipzig University alumni
University of Wittenberg alumni
University of Jena alumni
University of Altdorf alumni
University of Padua alumni
1610 births
1688 deaths